Paris by Night 93: Celebrity Dancing - Khiêu Vũ Của Các Ngôi Sao is a Paris by Night program produced by Thuy Nga that was filmed at the Charles M. Schulz Theatre in Knott's Berry Farm on May 14, 2008.

The show is an adaptation from the international reality TV show Dancing with the Stars where Thúy Nga contracted-singers were paired up with professional ballroom dancers who have participated in Dancing with the Stars and So You Think You Can Dance.  The singers compete to become the winner of the show. Besides dancing, there are a skit performed by Hoài Linh and Chí Tài as well as some guest performances from Thúy Nga singers such as Như Loan, Dương Triệu Vũ, Tuấn Hùng, Thùy Vân, Nguyệt Anh, Hồ Lệ Thu and Bạch Yến.  As the program is not a regular variety show, seven MTVs were added as a bonus at the end of the released DVD.  Thúy Nga also does a Dancing Live Tour featuring the dances in Paris by Night 93 at the major cities around the U.S. where the Vietnamese community is concentrated. 

After the success of the show, Paris by Night 97: Celebrity Dancing 2 - Khiêu Vũ Của Các Ngôi Sao 2 will be filmed at the same venue on April 22, 2009.

The winners

Most Improved Award: Huơng Thủy

Judges' Choice:

1st Place: Huơng Thủy

2nd Place: Hương Lan

3rd Place: Khánh Hà

Audiences' Choice: Mai Tiến Dũng

Track list

Disc 1

 Samba: Bên Nhau Đêm Nay (Dancing All Night) – Nguyễn Cao Kỳ Duyên, Brian, Christian, Anya, Christina, Riohot Dance Group
 Giới Thiệu Ban Giám Khảo – Khánh Ly, Shanda Sawyer, Nguyễn Hưng, Ðức Huy
 Pasodoble: Tan Tác – Quỳnh Vi/Tuấn Hùng
 Cha Cha: Thôi – Trần Thái Hòa/Kaskia
 Slow Waltz: Suối Tóc – Phi Khanh/Adam Jona
 Swing: 60 Năm Cuộc Đời – Mai Tiến Dũng/Anya
 Slow Fox Trot: Yêu Nhau Đi – Lynda Trang Đài/Pasha
 Rumba: Biển Tình – Quang Lê/Thùy Vân
 Waltz: Luân Vũ Ngày Mưa – Bảo Hân/Brian
 Tango: Trizzie's Tango – Trizzie Phương Trinh/Christian
 Cha Cha: Lời Tỏ Tình Dễ Thương 2 – Lương Tùng Quang/Kristina
 Waltz: Mưa – Hương Lan/Tuấn Hùng
 Salsa: Chờ Một Tiếng Yêu – Minh Tuyết/Pasha

Disc 2

 Cha Cha: Nào Biết Nào Hay? (quizas?) - Hương Thủy/Christian
 Rumba: Em Là Tất Cả - Bằng Kiều/Alien
 Mambo: Mambo Italiano - Khánh Hà/Adam Jona
 Skit: Mộng Khiêu Vũ - Hoài Linh, Chí Tài
 Trái Tim Đã Được Yêu - Như Loan
 Em Ở Đâu? - Dương Triệu Vũ
 Hào Hoa - Tuấn Hùng, Thùy Vân
 Ru Lòng Khờ Dại - Nguyệt Anh
 Mambo Yêu Thương - Hồ Lệ Thu
 Ghen - Bạch Yến
 Giải Tiến Bộ (Best Progress Award)
 Giải Ban Giám Khảo (Judges Choice Winner)
 Giải Khán Giả ( Audience's Choice Winner)
 Finale

Bonus MTV

 Bonus MTV: Mong Chờ – Ngọc Liên
 Thương Hoài Ngàn Năm – Mai Thiên Vân
 Bởi Vì Anh Yêu Em – Minh Tuyết, Bằng Kiều
 Dừng Bước – Mai Quốc Huy
 Tôi Đi Giữa Trời Âu – Hà Phương
 Thương Về Cố Đô – Nguyên Lê
 Nội Tôi – Duy Trường
 Hậu Trường Sân Khấu – Behind The Scenes

Paris by Night

vi:Paris By Night 93